The 78th Regiment Indiana Infantry was an infantry regiment that served in the Union Army during the American Civil War.

Service
The 78th Indiana Infantry was organized at Indianapolis, Indiana for 60 days service and mustered on August 5, 1862 under the command of Lieutenant Colonel William L. Farrow.

The regiment was engaged in guard duty at Evansville, Indiana and operated against guerrillas in Kentucky until October 3, 1862. Part of the regiment was engaged at Uniontown, Kentucky on September 1, 1862. Company K was detached and became engaged at the Battle of Munfordville, where it was captured with the Union garrison.

The 78th Indiana Infantry mustered out of service on October 3, 1862.

Casualties
The regiment lost a total of 5 men during service; 1 officer and 1 enlisted man killed, 3 enlisted men died of disease.

Commanders
 Lieutenant Colonel William L. Farrow

See also

 List of Indiana Civil War regiments
 Indiana in the Civil War

References
 Dyer, Frederick H. A Compendium of the War of the Rebellion (Des Moines, IA: Dyer Pub. Co.), 1908.
Attribution
 

Military units and formations established in 1862
Military units and formations disestablished in 1862
Units and formations of the Union Army from Indiana
1862 establishments in Indiana